The 2014 British National Track Championships are a series of track cycling competitions held from 24–28 September 2014, at the Manchester Velodrome. They were organised and sanctioned by British Cycling, and were open to British cyclists.

Competition
Separate competitions were held for both men and women, and 6 events were also included for paracyclists, an increase on 4 in 2013. No events were held in Omnium or Madison; the men's and women's programme was broadly identical, and otherwise matched the programme of the UCI World Track Cycling Championships. The women's team pursuit was held over 4000m for four cyclists for the second year.

Open to British cyclists, the winners of each event are entitled to wear the national champion's jersey - a white jersey with a red, white and blue front stripe - for the next year when competing in that discipline.

The sprint events were dominated by Callum Skinner and Jessica Varnish picking up four gold each, and a clean sweep of sprint events; Skinner shared team sprint gold with Olympic champions Jason Kenny and Philip Hindes, while Varnish secured team sprint gold with Dannielle Khan. All women's individual sprint medals were shared among Varnish, Khan, Victoria Williamson and Katy Marchant. Matthew Crampton took silvers in each of the individual sprint events.

The endurance events produced more unpredictable racing with Paralympian Dame Sarah Story securing points race gold, and Katie Archibald beating World, Olympic and Commonwealth champions Joanna Rowsell and Laura Trott in the individual pursuit.

Almost forty years after Maurice Burton, Britain's first black national champion on the track won the last of his senior national titles, his son Germain won his first, in the team pursuit.

Rachel James, sister of absent former World Champion Becky James achieved a unique double, medalling in both able bodied and paralympic events; she achieved a bronze in the team sprint, and piloted double Commonwealth Games champion Sophie Thornhill to two National titles for blind or visually impaired cyclists, in Kilo and 200m flying lap time trials.

Medal summary

Men's Events

Women's Events

Para-cycling Events
A series of para-cycling national championships are also held over combined categories using a points system.

A.T. = Actual Time
F.T. = Factored time

References

2014 in track cycling
British National Track Championships
British National Track Championships